Sunny Girl is a 2011 Taiwanese drama starring Wu Chun and Rainie Yang. It is produced by Comic International Productions (可米國際影視事業股份有限公司). The drama started filming in May 2010 and wrapped on 21 September 2010. It was filmed on location in Taiwan, China and Japan. It was broadcast in the summer of 2011. Sunny Girl is the Taiwanese remake of the 2002 Korean drama Successful Story of a Bright Girl.

Plot

Details
 Title: 陽光天使 (阳光天使) / Yang Guang Tian Shi 
 English title: Sunny Girl / Sunshine Angel 
 Episodes:14
 Broadcast network: Hunan TV / TTV / GTV
 Broadcast period: 2011-Jul-06 / 2011-Aug-04 / 2011-Aug-14
 Air time: Thursday 22:10 
 Opening theme song: Sunny by Boney M 
 Ending theme song: Bu Neng Gao Su Wo (不能告訴我) by Nylon Chen

Cast
 Wu Chun as Di Yaxin (狄雅辛)
 Rainie Yang as Chen Yangguang (陳陽光)
 Liu Zi Yan as Angela 殷安琪 
 Johnny Zhang as Geng Fei 耿非 
 Lee Shiau Shiang as Ai Yingshan 艾英善 
 Ku Pao-ming as Yang Yilang 陽一郎 
 Zhao Shu Hai as Geng Guwen 耿顧問 
 Wu Qian Qian as Elizabeth 殷董事長 
 Ryoko Nakano (中野良子) as Yangguang's grandmother 
 Muto Nobutomi (武藤信美) as Xiao Lin He Zi 小林和子 
 Zhang Guang Lei (張光磊) as Qi Lei 齊磊 
 Bai Yun (白雲) as Liao Jianyu 廖建宇 
 Ya Zi (丫子) as Liao's sister

Guest stars
 Jiro Wang as Jiro
 Calvin Chen as Calvin
 Aaron Yan as Aaron "Wen Shuxiu"  (温舒秀)

References

Taiwanese drama television series
Taiwan Television original programming
2011 Taiwanese television series debuts
2011 Taiwanese television series endings